West Springfield may refer to:

 West Springfield, Massachusetts, United States
 West Springfield, Virginia, United States
 West Springfield, a fictional location in The Simpsons episode "Half-Decent Proposal"